Torila is a village in Peipsiääre Parish, Tartu County in eastern Estonia.

Composer and conductor Eduard Tubin (1905–1982) was born in Torila.

References

 

Villages in Tartu County
Kreis Dorpat